Vertebral scales, in snakes, are large scales along the top of the back of the snake, i.e., the uppermost row. They are a specialised form of dorsal scales.

Vertebral is a term associated with the backbone, but also central scales such as on the carapace of a chelonian shell.

Related scales
 Dorsal scales

See also
 Snake scales
 Anatomical terms of location

References

Snake scales